The Eek River is a  tributary of the Kuskokwim River in the U.S. state of Alaska. It is south of the Kwethluk River and north of the Kanektok River, which also drain into the Kuskokwim or Kuskokwim Bay on the Bering Sea.

Beginning at a small lake near Mount Oratia in the Togiak National Wildlife Refuge, the Eek River flows generally northwest into the Yukon Delta National Wildlife Refuge to meet the larger river near Eek Island in western Alaska. The Eek River supports large populations of pink salmon and Arctic char.

See also
List of rivers of Alaska

References

External links
Eek River System – Alaska Department of Natural Resources

Rivers of Bethel Census Area, Alaska
Rivers of Alaska
Rivers of Unorganized Borough, Alaska